Thief is an Apple II multidirectional shooter written by Bob Flanagan and published by Datamost in 1981. It is a clone of the 1980 arcade game Berzerk from Stern Electronics.

Gameplay

The game puts the player in control of a thief that must make his way through simple mazes, though there are no objects to actually steal. Each level is populated by stocky, possibly robotic guards that converge on the player, and which the player must either shoot or evade.

See also
 K-Razy Shoot-Out
 Robon
 Robot Attack

References

1981 video games
Apple II games
Apple II-only games
Datamost games
Multidirectional shooters
Video games developed in the United States
Video game clones
Single-player video games